Kristjan Valdimar "Val" Bjornson (August 29, 1906 – March 10, 1987) was an American writer, newspaper editor, and politician who served as the State Treasurer of Minnesota for more than two decades.

Bjornson was born in Minneota, Minnesota of Icelandic descent. In World War II, he served in Navy intelligence, stationed in Iceland. Besides English, he was fluent in Icelandic, Finnish, Danish, Swedish, and Norwegian.

He was part owner of the Minneota Mascot newspaper and an associate editor at the St. Paul Pioneer Press.

Running as the Republican candidate in the 1954 United States Senate elections, Bjornson lost to Hubert Humphrey, with whom he sometimes shared a car to travel around the state.

Bjornson died in Minneapolis on March 10, 1987. The University of Minnesota, his alma mater, and the University of Iceland have a student exchange scholarship named in his honor.

Bibliography

References

1906 births
1987 deaths
United States Navy personnel of World War II
American people of Icelandic descent
Military personnel from Minnesota
Minnesota Republicans
People from Minneota, Minnesota
State treasurers of Minnesota
United States Navy sailors
University of Minnesota alumni
Writers from Minnesota
20th-century American politicians